Giairo Ermeti (born 7 April 1981 in Rottofreno) is an Italian former professional road bicycle racer, who competed as a professional between 2005 and 2013.

Ermeti retired at the end of the 2013 season.

Palmarès 

 2003
 1st, Stage 3, Giro del Friuli Venezia Giulia, Lignano Sabbiadoro
 2004
 1st, National Road Championships, Elite without contract
 1st Stage 1 Volta a Lleida
 1st, Giro Internazionale del Valdarno
 1st, Piccolo Giro di Lombardia
 2006
 1st, Giro del Lago Maggiore-GP Knorr
 2007
 National Track Championships, Dalmine
 1st, Individual Pursuit
 1st, Team Pursuit (with Claudio Cucinotta, Matteo Montaguti and Alessandro De Marchi)
 1st, Scratch

Grand Tour general classification results timeline

References

External links 

1981 births
Living people
Sportspeople from the Province of Piacenza
Italian male cyclists
Cyclists from Emilia-Romagna